Melanolophia is a genus of moths in the family Geometridae described by George Duryea Hulst in 1896.

Species
Melanolophia canadaria (Guenée, 1857)
Melanolophia centralis McDunnough, 1920
Melanolophia imitata (Walker, 1860)
Melanolophia imperfectaria (Walker, 1860)
Melanolophia sadrinaria Rindge, 1964
Melanolophia signataria (Walker, 1860)

References

Melanolophiini